Bergoo is a census-designated place (CDP) in Webster County, West Virginia, United States. As of the 2010 census, its population was 94. Bergoo lies at the confluence of the Elk River and Leatherwood Creek. Bergoo was formerly known as Leatherwood, taking its name from the creek.

Some say Bergoo was the name of a local Indian, while others believe the community was named after Burgoo, a type of stew.

Climate
The climate in this area has mild differences between highs and lows, and there is adequate rainfall year-round.  According to the Köppen Climate Classification system, Bergoo has a marine west coast climate, abbreviated "Cfb" on climate maps.

References

Census-designated places in Webster County, West Virginia
Census-designated places in West Virginia
Coal towns in West Virginia